E-Artsup is a French private school created in 2001 and specialized in digital creativity and multimedia. The school is located at Paris, Bordeaux, Lyon, Nantes, Montpellier, Toulouse, Strasbourg and Lille and is part of IONIS Education Group. The school delivers degrees recognized by French state which last five years. There are approximately 100 graduates per year. It is one of the only universities in France to specialize in digital creativity and multimedia.

In April 2015, a new digital and innovative campus has opened in Paris (Le Marais-Bastille) bringing together the ISEG, Sup'Internet, Epitech Digital and e-artsup.

Curriculum 
The school provides four programs : Art direction, Motion Design, Animation 2D/3D & Game Design 
A five-year course in digital creativity. The first two years focus on the acquisition of basic knowledge of drawing: academic drawing, life model drawing, analytical drawing, perspective, and computer graphics. During the third year, students learn subjects such as 3D creativity, web design, graphic arts, photography, identity design, creative advertising, typography and motion design. During the last two years of the curriculum, students choose an area of specialization among the four provided: communication, animation, Motion Design, Concept Art Design Digital & Business, game design and interactive design.

References

External links 
 

Educational institutions established in 2001
Education in Lyon
Education in Nantes
Education in Lille
Education in Montpellier
Education in Toulouse
Education in Île-de-France
2001 establishments in France